Mengrai may refer to:

Mangrai (the Great), 13th-century king of Lanna
Mengrai Subdistrict in Phaya Mengrai District, Chiang Rai Province, Thailand